Peter IX may refer to:

 Peter IX de Rochechouart, bishop of the Ancient Diocese of Saintes in 1493–1503
 Peter Legh IX, one of the Leghs of Lyme in the 16th century